Anolcites is a genus of extinct ammonoid cephalopods from the Middle Triassic belonging to the ceratitid family Trachyceratidae.

Specifically Anolcites is a middle Triassic trachyceriatid with no distinct ventral furrow and ribs that cross the venter. The shell is basically evolute and highly ornamented with close spaced flexious, or sigmoidal, ribbing. The whorl section is compressed with straight sides and strongly arched venter.

Anolcites has been found in British Columbia, China, India, and Italy.

References 

" Arkell et al. Mesozoic Ammonoidea. Treatise on Invertebrate Paleontology, Part L, Ammonoidea. 1957
 Paleobio Anolcites

Trachyceratidae
Ceratitida genera
Middle Triassic ammonites
Triassic ammonites of Europe